Cicindela restricta is a species of ground beetle of the subfamily Cicindelinae. It is found in Mongolia, southeastern Russia, and Heilongjiang province of China. It is green in colour and have yellow spots on its thorax.

References

restricta
Beetles described in 1828
Beetles of Asia